P. gardneri may refer to:
 Proechimys gardneri, the Gardner's spiny-rat, a rat species from South America
 Psychotria gardneri, a plant species endemic to Sri Lanka

See also 
 Gardneri